The office of the Governor of Chuuk is the highest elected position in the state of Chuuk, Federated States of Micronesia. The state was called Truk until 1989, so the title of this office prior to the change was Governor of Truk.

History of the office holders follows

References

External links
ELIMO CERTIFIED AS THE WINNER OF THE CHUUK "SPECIAL" ELECTION FOR GOVERNOR

Chuuk State
1979 establishments in the Trust Territory of the Pacific Islands